Michael Andrews may refer to:

 Michael Andrews (artist) (1928–1995), British artist
 Michael Andrews (boxer), Nigerian boxer
 Michael Andrews (musician) (born 1967), American musician
 Michael Andrews (rugby league) (born 1962), Australian rugby league footballer
 Michael A. Andrews (born 1944), member of the United States House of Representatives in the 103rd United States Congress
 Mike Andrews (born 1943), American baseball player
 Mike Andrews (footballer) (born 1946), Australian rules football player for Fitzroy
 Mickey Andrews (born 1942), American football coach
 Michael Andrews (referee) (born 1956), Indian football referee

See also
Michael Andrew (disambiguation)